William Henry White (August 21, 1865 – June 11, 1930) was a farmer and a federal politician from northern Alberta, Canada.

White was born in City View, Canada West (present-day Ontario) in 1865 and was educated in local schools (in the Ottawa area). He came west as a member of the Royal North-West Mounted Police in 1881. From 1887 to 1891, he was a homestead inspector. In 1897, he married Annie Davies and had 2 sons and one daughter.

References

External links
 

1865 births
1930 deaths
Members of the House of Commons of Canada from Alberta
Liberal Party of Canada MPs